Shashank Nag (born 20 August 1982) is an Indian former cricketer. He played seventeen first-class matches for Hyderabad between 2004 and 2010.

See also
 List of Hyderabad cricketers

References

External links
 

1982 births
Living people
Indian cricketers
Hyderabad cricketers
People from Krishna district
Cricketers from Andhra Pradesh
Hyderabad Heroes cricketers